In ancient geography, Peuce is a former island in the Danube Delta, in Scythia Minor (present-day Tulcea County, Romania). It was about the size of the island of Rhodes. The inhabitants of the island were called Peucini.

It was to this island that in the 330s BC the West Thracian Triballian king Syrmus took refuge when pursued by Alexander the Great.  Alexander brought ships up the Danube to use in an assault on the island.  The attempts failed due to the swift current of the river, steep banks, and fierce defense.  Eventually the Macedonians abandoned their attacks on Peuce and instead crossed into the territory of the Getae.

A portion of the powerful Bastarnae tribe (probably a mixed Germanic-Celtic society) settled on the island, apparently in the 2nd century BC,  and adopted from their abode an alternative tribal name, "Peucini", used by some classical authors to cover sections of the Bastarnae tribe which had never set foot on the island.

Peuce island is also thought to be the birthplace of Alaric I (Alaric or Alarich; in Latin, Alaricus) king of the Visigoths from 395 to 410 who is most famous for his sack of Rome in 410.

The Battle of Ongal of 680 also took place on the Peuce Island. The battle was crucial for the creation of the First Bulgarian Empire.

The island disappeared during the Early Middle Ages, when the Danube's distributaries changed courses.

References

External links
information on ancient Peuke island (Romanian & English text available).

Islands of Romania
Islands of the Black Sea
Former islands
History of Dobruja
Former populated places in Romania